The Specialized Commissions of the Parliament of Iran are groups of representatives that are formed with the aim of expertly reviewing the plans and bills proposed in the Islamic Consultative Assembly of Iran.

Pursuant to Article 66 of the Constitution of the Islamic Republic of Iran, the number of commissions and the term of office of the representatives in them will be specified in the Law on Internal Regulations of the Islamic Consultative Assembly (Parliament of Iran).

Article 85 of the Constitution of the Islamic Republic of Iran also states:

Normally, the plans and bills of the Iranian parliament are first examined by the relevant commissions, and during the draft in the open court of the parliament, the final opinion of the commission is asked and announced.

Regulations 
Pursuant to Article 38 of the Law on Internal Regulations of the Islamic Consultative Assembly, the Parliament of Iran has specialized commissions in two categories of Privileged commissions and Expert commissions with a specific scope of duties as described in the internal regulations of the parliament. The number of members of Expert commissions is at least nineteen and at most twenty-three, and the number of members of Privileged commissions is determined according to Articles (39) to (44) of the internal regulations.

Duties and authorities 
Pursuant to Article 45 of the Law on Internal Regulations of the Islamic Consultative Assembly, each of the Expert commissions of the parliament of Iran that are formed in accordance with these by-laws have the following duties and authorities in their specialized areas:

Commissions 
Currently, the specialized commissions of the Islamic Consultative Assembly (Parliament of Iran) formed under two categories of Privileged commissions and Expert commissions in accordance with the provisions of the Law on Internal Regulations of the Islamic Consultative Assembly. These commissions include:

Privileged commissions

Expert commissions

See also 
 List of female members of the Islamic Consultative Assembly
 List of Iranian legislative elections

References

Committees of the Iranian Parliament